The China Meteorological Administration (CMA) is the national weather service of the People's Republic of China. The institution is located in Beijing.

History
The agency was originally established in December 1949 as the Central Military Commission Meteorological Bureau. It replaced the Central Weather Bureau formed in 1941. In 1994, the CMA was transformed from a subordinate governmental body into one of the public service agencies under the State Council.

Meteorological bureaus are established in 31 provinces, autonomous regions and municipalities, excluding meteorological services at Hong Kong, Macau and Taiwan. 14 meteorological bureaus at sub-provincial cities including 4 cities which have been specifically designated in the state development plan), 318 meteorological bureaus at prefecture level and 2,300 bureaus (stations) at county level.

Subordinate bodies under the CMA

National Meteorological Center (the Central Meteorological Observatory)
National Satellite Meteorological Centre (National Centre for Space Weather Monitoring and Warning)
National Climate Center
National Meteorological Information Centre
Chinese Academy of Meteorological Sciences
Meteorological Observation Center
China Meteorological Administration Training Centre
Department of Capital Construction & Real Estate Management
Logistic Service Centre
Audio-Visual Publicity Center
China Meteorological News Press, and Meteorological Press.
China Weather TV

See also

The Special Administrative Regions operate their own meteorological units outside of CMA:

Hong Kong Observatory
Macao Meteorological and Geophysical Bureau

References

External links 
  
  

 
Governmental meteorological agencies in Asia
1949 establishments in China